The name Nisha has been used for one tropical cyclone in the North Indian Ocean:
Cyclone Nisha (2008) of 2008, made landfall in Tamil Nadu, India, killed at least 204 people, and did at least $800 million (2008 USD) in damages

The name Nisha has been also used for three tropical cyclones in the South Pacific:
Tropical Cyclone Nisha-Orama (1983), formed and existed at the same time as Severe Tropical Cyclone Oscar
Tropical Cyclone Nisha (1993), remained away from highly populated islands
Tropical Cyclone Nisha (2010), weak storm that remained away from highly populated islands

South Pacific cyclone set index articles
North Indian cyclone set index articles